Savi Technology was founded in 1989 and is based in Alexandria, Virginia.

The company was spun-off from Lockheed Martin in 2012.

The company offers a variety of hardware including tags (also called sensors) that enable governments and organizations to access real-time information on the location, condition, and security status of assets and shipments; mobile IoT sensors, fixed and mobile readers; active radio-frequency identification devices and sensors; and portable deployment kits (PDKs).

References 

Bloomberg
The Washington Post

Radio-frequency identification
Supply chain software companies
Logistics industry in the United States
Supply chain analytics